Cyperus difformis is a species of sedge known by several common names, including variable flatsedge, smallflower umbrella-sedge and rice sedge. This plant is native to southern Europe, most of Africa and Asia, and Australia, and it is naturalized in other areas of the world, including large parts of the Americas.

Cyperus difformis is a plant of aquatic and moist habitats. It is a weed of rice fields, but not generally a troublesome one. This is an annual herb with one to many thin, soft erect stems reaching over 30 centimeters in maximum height. There are usually a few long, wispy leaves around the base of the plant. The inflorescence is a rounded bundle one to three centimeters wide, containing up to 120 spikelets, each long and partially or entirely covered in up to 30 bracted flowers. The flowers are light brown with areas darker brown and sometimes a yellowish or purplish tint.

References

External links
Jepson Manual Treatment

Photo gallery
Cyperus difformis occurrence data from GBIF

difformis
Freshwater plants
Plants described in 1756
Flora of Europe
Flora of Asia
Flora of Africa
Flora of Australia
Taxa named by Carl Linnaeus